Nitric oxide synthase 1 adaptor protein (NOS1AP) also known as carboxyl-terminal PDZ ligand of neuronal nitric oxide synthase protein (CAPON) is a protein that in humans is encoded by the NOS1AP gene.

This gene encodes a cytosolic protein that binds to the signaling molecule, neuronal nitric oxide synthase (nNOS). This protein has a C-terminal PDZ-binding domain that mediates interactions with nNOS and an N-terminal phosphotyrosine binding (PTB) domain that binds to the small monomeric G protein, Dexras1. Studies of the related mouse and rat proteins have shown that this protein functions as an adapter protein linking nNOS to specific targets, such as Dexras1 and the synapsins. NOS1AP polymorphisms has been associated with the QT interval length.

Interactions 

NOS1AP has been shown to interact with:
 LRP1,
 LRP2,
 NOS1,
 RASD1,
 SYN1

References

Further reading 

 
 
 
 
 
 

Biology of bipolar disorder